Laurent Jans (born 5 August 1992) is a Luxembourgish professional footballer who plays for German  club Waldhof Mannheim as a right back.

Club career
Jans has played club football for Fola Esch and Waasland-Beveren. He went on trial with Scottish club Dundee in August 2014.

In July 2019 Jans joined SC Paderborn 07, newly promoted to the Bundesliga, from FC Metz on a season-long loan. Paderborn secured an option to sign him permanently. In May 2021 he left Belgian club Standard Liège for Dutch club Sparta Rotterdam.

On 19 August 2022, Jans moved to Waldhof Mannheim in the German 3. Liga.

International career
Jans made his senior international debut for Luxembourg in 2012, and has appeared in FIFA World Cup qualifying matches. He previously represented Luxembourg at under-19 and under-21 youth level.

International goals
Scores and results list Luxembourg's goal tally first.

References

External links
 

1992 births
Living people
Luxembourgian footballers
Luxembourg youth international footballers
Luxembourg under-21 international footballers
Luxembourg international footballers
CS Fola Esch players
S.K. Beveren players
FC Metz players
SC Paderborn 07 players
Standard Liège players
Sparta Rotterdam players
SV Waldhof Mannheim players
Belgian Pro League players
Ligue 2 players
Bundesliga players
Eredivisie players
3. Liga players
Association football fullbacks
Luxembourgian expatriate footballers
Expatriate footballers in Belgium
Luxembourgian expatriate sportspeople in Belgium
Expatriate footballers in France
Luxembourgian expatriate sportspeople in France
Expatriate footballers in Germany
Luxembourgian expatriate sportspeople in Germany
Expatriate footballers in the Netherlands
Luxembourgian expatriate sportspeople in the Netherlands